Robert Atkins  (10 August 1886 – 9 February 1972) was an English actor, producer and director.

Biography 
Born in Dulwich, London, England, to Annie Evans and Robert Atkins sr. He had a brother named Lawrence. Atkins was most famous for his association with the theatre. An early graduate of Beerbohm Tree's Academy of Dramatic Art, he joined the Old Vic company in 1915, and became Director of Productions for Lilian Baylis from 1921 to 1926. He also appeared many times on film and in television, though not with the success of his theatre career. 

His first film was a 1913 production of Hamlet, as the First Player, with Johnston Forbes-Robertson in the title role. Atkins went on to appear in several other film and television roles over the next 50 years with the most famous production possibly being A Matter of Life and Death.  He also produced and/or directed several adaptations of William Shakespeare plays during the '40s and '50s for British TV.

He was director of the Shakespeare Memorial Theatre in Stratford, and along with Sydney Carroll, also founded Regent's Park Open Air Theatre.

Robert Atkins was married twice: to Mary Sumner whom he divorced, and to Ethel Davey, a film editor.  He died in London, England in 1972.

Filmography

References

External links

1886 births
1972 deaths
Alumni of RADA
English male stage actors
English male film actors
English male television actors
Commanders of the Order of the British Empire
Male actors from London
People from Dulwich
20th-century English male actors